General Long may refer to:

Armistead Lindsay Long (1825-1891), Confederate States Army brigadier general
Arthur Long (British Army officer) (1866–1941), British Army brigadier general
Charles G. Long (1869–1943), U.S. Marine Corps major general 
Daniel E. Long Jr. (fl. 1960s–2010s), U.S. Army major general
Earl C. Long (1883–1983), U.S. Marine Corps major general
Eli Long (1837–1903), Union Army major general
George Long (bishop) (1874–1930), Australian Imperial Force brigadier general
Oscar Fitzalan Long (1852–1928), U.S. Army brigadier general
Robert Ballard Long (1771–1825), British Army lieutenant general
Walter Long (British Army officer) (1879–1917), British Army brigadier general 
Long Jiguang (1867–1925), Chinese Imperial general
Long Jinguang (1863–1917), Chinese Imperial general

See also
General Lang (disambiguation)